The Primera División de Fútbol Profesional Clausura 2006 season (officially "Torneo Clausura 2006") started on January 14, 2006.

The season was composed of the following clubs:

 C.D. FAS
 C.D. Vista Hermosa
 San Salvador F.C.
 C.D. Águila
 C.D. Luis Ángel Firpo
 A.D. Isidro Metapán
 C.D. Atlético Balboa
 Alianza F.C.
 C.D. Chalatenango
 Once Municipal

Team information

Personnel and sponsoring

Managerial changes

Before the season

During the season

Clausura 2006 standings

Semifinals 1st Leg

Semifinals 2nd Leg

Final

List of foreign players in the league
This is a list of foreign players in Clausura 2006. The following players:
have played at least one apetura game for the respective club.
have not been capped for the El Salvador national football team on any level, independently from the birthplace

C.D. Águila
  Fabio Ulloa
  Juan Camilo Mejia
  Francisco Serrano
  Giribeth Cotes

Alianza F.C.
  Eduardo Escobar
  Jose Luis Osorio
  Arturo Albarrán
  Didier Ovono

Atletico Balboa
  Franklin Webster
  Gabriel Garcete
  Pablo Quinones
  Ernesto Noel Aquino

Chalatenango
  Nicolás Muñoz
  Victor Mafla
  César Charum
  Germán Carty

C.D. FAS
  Lucas Abraham
  Nestor Ayala
  Wolde Harris
  Santiago Autino  
  Martín Boasso  

 (player released mid season)
 Injury replacement player

C.D. Luis Ángel Firpo
  Alexander Obregón
  Mauro Caju  
  Nilson Pérez
  Pablo Vacca
  José Laurindo

A.D. Isidro Metapán
  Paolo Suarez
  Alcides Bandera
  Williams Reyes
  Marlon Godoy

Once Municipal
  James Owusu
  Libardo Barbajal
  Austin Nwoko (Austin Knoko)
  Matias Milozzi

San Salvador F.C.
  Paulo Cesar Rodriguez
  Hermes Martínez Misal
  Evance Benwell
  Rodrigo Lagos
   Fabio de Azevedo  

Vista Hermosa
  Patricio Barroche
  Elder Figueroa
  Luis Torres Rodriguez

External links

Primera División de Fútbol Profesional Clausura seasons
El
1